The flag of Rome, the capital city of Italy, is a bicolour rectangle, divided into two equally-sized vertical stripes: red-violet on the left, and a ochre yellow on the right.

Design
The civil flag of Rome is divided into two vertical stripes of equal size, a red-violet on the left, and a ochre yellow on the right.

The state flag of the city includes the coat of arms placed in the centre. It consists of the yellow (golden) Greek cross near the top left corner, and to its right, the yellow (golden) letters SPQR (an abbreviation for Senatus Populusque Romanus, which translates from Latin to The Roman Senate and People), placed diagonally, from top left to bottom right, across the red Heater-style escutcheon (shield) with square top and pointed base. On the top of the shield is placed a yellow (golden) open crown, crown with five flowers, and with red, white, and green jewels.

History

Since the Middle Ages the city of Rome used a red-violet banner with a yellow (golden) Greek cross near the top right corner, and to its right, the yellow (golden) letters SPQR (an abbreviation for Senatus Populusque Romanus, which translates from Latin to The Roman Senate and People), placed diagonally across the banner, from the top left to the bottom right corner.

It is believed that the modern flag design, with the red and yellow vertical stripes, was introduced in 1870, the year when the city was incorporated into the Kingdom of Italy. In 1884, the city officially introduced its coat of arms, which then began being displayed on the state flag variant. Its design was based on a wall carving dating back to the 14th century, which depicted the oldest representation of the city coat of arms. The colours were based on the flag. In the centre of the coat of arms was a red-violet oval, depicting the yellow (golden) Greek cross in the top left, and to its right, the yellow (golden) letters SPQR (an abbreviation for Senatus Populusque Romanus, which translates from Latin to The Roman Senate and People), placed diagonally, from top left to bottom right, across the oval. The oval was placed within a yellow (golden) Baroque-style escutcheon with scroll-eared top, and lobed base. Above it was placed a yellow (golden) open crown with five flowers and the crown jewels. Senatus Popolusque Romanus (SPQR) was officially adopted as the city motto on 26 August 1927.

The coat of arms design was used from 1884 to 2004, when it was replaced with the current, simplified design, including the change to simplified red Heater-style escutcheon (shield) with square top and pointed base. Subsequently, the new design began being featured on the civil flag.

References

Flag
Flag
Flags with crosses
Flags of cities in Italy
Flags introduced in 1870
Flags introduced in 1884
Flags introduced in 2004
1870 establishments in Italy
1884 establishments in Italy
2004 establishments in Italy